"We'll Live It All Again" was the  entry in the Eurovision Song Contest 1976, performed in Italian and English by Al Bano and Romina Power. This was the country's first entry not to be sung entirely in Italian, and one of only three (alongside 1984's "I treni di Tozeur" and 1991's "Comme è ddoce 'o mare") between the country's debut and its 1998–2010 hiatus. Bano and Power also recorded the song in Spanish and French, entitled "Viviremos todo de nuevo" and "T'aimer encore une fois" respectively. The latter was a chart hit in France. In 1982, they re-recorded "We'll Live It All Again" for their Spanish language album Felicidad, then with new lyrics and retitled "Vivirlo otra vez".

The song is a love duet sung from the perspective of a married couple addressing each other. They recall their first kiss and their early relationship and later sing about their pride at having a daughter together. They tell each other that they would each "live it all again" and if this were the case, "I'd always choose you again".

The song was performed thirteenth on the night, following 's Braulio with "Sobran las palabras" and preceding 's Waterloo & Robinson with "My Little World". At the close of voting, it had received 69 points, placing 7th in a field of 18.

It was succeeded as Italian representative at the 1977 contest by Mia Martini with "Libera".

Track listing
7" Single
A. "We'll Live It All Again (Lo rivivrei)" – 4:07
B. "Na, na, na" – 3:33

Spanish 7" Single
A. "Viviremos todo de nuevo" – 4:12
B. "Mai, mai, mai" – 4:00

French 7" Single
A. "T'aimer encore une fois" (Version française) – 4:05
B. "T'aimer encore une fois" (Version italienne) – 4:05

Chart performance

References

1976 singles
Eurovision songs of 1976
Eurovision songs of Italy
Male–female vocal duets
1976 songs
Al Bano and Romina Power songs
Songs written by Al Bano